Journey to Greenland is a 2016 French comedy film directed by Sébastien Betbeder. The film was screened at the ACID event of the 2016 Cannes Film Festival.

Cast 
 Thomas Blanchard - Thomas
  - Thomas
  - Nathan
 Ole Eliassen - Ole

References

External links 

2016 comedy films
French comedy films
2010s French films
2010s French-language films